Shu-Cheen Yu is a Chinese-Australian opera singer. Her album Lotus Moon was nominated at the ARIA Music Awards of 2001 for Best Classical Album.

Born in China, she established herself as a folk singer, releasing five albums. In 1987, she moved to Australia and became a cleaner. She took on a three year opera course and was cast in a 1990 production of the musical Chess, continuing onto other productions.

Discography

Awards and nominations
The ARIA Music Awards is an annual awards ceremony that recognises excellence, innovation, and achievement across all genres of Australian music. They commenced in 1987. 

! 
|-
| 2001
| Lotus Moon
| Best Classical Album
| 
| 
|-

References

External links
 
 Profile, Opera Australia
 , Art Gallery of New South Wales, 2011

Australian operatic sopranos
Living people
1962 births
Chinese emigrants to Australia
People from Datong
20th-century Chinese women singers
20th-century Australian women opera singers
21st-century Australian women singers